Potworks Dam is a dam that used to impound the largest reservoir on the island of Antigua, in Antigua and Barbuda of the eastern Caribbean.

The dam is located in the east of the island, between Pares and Bethesda. 

Because of recent droughts the reservoir no longer exists, and natural vegetation has grown in the lakebed.

See also

References
Scott, C. R. (ed.) (2005) Insight guide: Caribbean (5th edition). London: Apa Publications.

Bodies of water of Antigua and Barbuda
Dams in Antigua and Barbuda
Saint Paul Parish, Antigua and Barbuda
Saint Peter Parish, Antigua and Barbuda